Songs for My Father is an album by composer/bassist Graham Collier recorded in 1970 and originally released on the British Fontana label.

Reception

Allmusic said "Songs for My Father is the first evidence listeners have of the maturing Collier, moving jazz aesthetics around in order to more fully articulate his sophisticated palette". On All About Jazz Nic Jones noted "it's the one that offers the greatest insight into Collier's more recent methodology, not least because the numbers of musicians involved are more indicative of his later work with larger ensembles".

Track listing
All compositions by Graham Collier.

 "Song One (Seven-Four)" – 9:34
 "Song Two (Ballad)" – 5:38
 "Song Three (Nine-Eight Blues)" – 7:52
 "Song Four (Waltz in Four-Four)" – 7:42
 "Song Five (Rubato)" – 4:43
 "Song Six (Dirge)" – 3:37
 "Song Seven (Four-Four Figured)" – 9:13

Personnel
Graham Collier – bass
Harry Beckett – trumpet, flugelhorn
Alan Wakeman – soprano saxophone, tenor saxophone
Bob Sydor – alto saxophone, tenor saxophone
John Taylor – piano
John Webb – drums
Derek Wadsworth – trombone (tracks 1–3 & 7)
Alan Skidmore, Tony Roberts – tenor saxophone (tracks 1, 5 & 7) 
Phil Lee – guitar (tracks 1 & 7)

References

1970 albums
Graham Collier albums
Albums produced by Terry Brown (record producer)
Fontana Records albums